(German for "homeland-films";) were films of a genre popular in Germany, Switzerland, and Austria from the late 1940s to the early 1960s. Heimat can be translated as "home" (in the geographic sense), "hometown" or "homeland".

History
The genre came to life after the devastation of Germany in World War II, and remained popular from the late 40s to the early 60s. The films suggested a whole, romantic world untouched by war and the hazards of real life. The Berlin-based studio Berolina Film was the driving force behind the development of Heimatfilme.

Contemporary concerns with expulsion and re-integration become manifest in many of the more than three hundred  that were produced during the 1950s. The  made during the chancellorships of Konrad Adenauer and Ludwig Erhard present idyllic images of the countryside. Nevertheless, the post-war genre does deal with questions of modernisation, social change and consumerism; it "affords the positive resolution of contemporary social and ideological concerns about territory and identity".

Criteria
Heimatfilme were usually shot in the Alps, the Black Forest, or the Lüneburg Heath, and always involved the outdoors. Their characteristics were their rural settings, sentimental tone and simplistic morality, and they centered on love, friendship, family and non-urban life. They also involved the difference between old and young, tradition and progress, and rural and urban life. The typical plot structure involved both a good and bad guy wanting a girl, conflict ensuing, and the good guy ultimately triumphing to win the girl, making all (except the bad guy) happy.

Legacy
In the late 1960s and the 1970s, young West German film directors associated with New German Cinema set out to challenge many of the cultural assumptions inherent in the Heimatfilm. The results are variously labelled "critical Heimatfilme", "new Heimatfilme", and "anti-Heimatfilme". Examples of such films include Volker Schlöndorff's Man on Horseback (1969) and The Sudden Wealth of the Poor People of Kombach (1970); Peter Fleischmann's Hunting Scenes from Bavaria (1969); Volker Vogeler's Jaider, the Lonely Hunter (1971); Reinhard Hauff's Mathias Kneissl (1970); and Uwe Brandner's I Love You, I Kill You (1971). A more recent example of an anti-Heimatfilm is Michael Haneke's Oscar-nominated The White Ribbon (2009).

The trilogy of films called Heimat by the German director Edgar Reitz (1984, 1992, and 2004) has been described as "post-Heimatfilm" because the director neither sets out to challenge the genre on political or social grounds nor idealizes the past to the extent that earlier Heimatfilme did.

Other cultural spaces 
The US heimatfilm is the Western, which shows a larger bandwidth. The film Hearwood (1998) by the German direction of the fifties was close to the genre. It was a rural love story, embedded in an ecologically colored economic conflict between a large-town bank and a village sawmill business.

Overall, there is a lot in common in the development of German home films and US Western. Early Western also showed an idealized world, full of clichés, woodcut characters and simple schemes. They were attributed by the italowesters in the 1960s, but also used a development that led to late westers and anti-Westerns, which draw sometimes pessimistic image like modern home films. Like these, modern Western should also be considered as history movies.

References 
Notes

Sources
 Cartmell, Deborah; Whelehan, Imelda. The Cambridge Companion to Literature on Screen. Cambridge: Cambridge University Press, 2007. 
 Hake, Sabine. German National Cinema. New York: Routledge, 2002.
 Moeller, Hans Bernhard; George L Lellis. Volker Schlondorff's Cinema: Adaptation, Politics, and the "Movie-Appropriate". Carbondale: Southern Illinois University Press, 2012.
 Von Moltke, Johannes. No Place Like Home: Locations of Heimat in German Cinema. Berkeley: U of California Press, 2005.

Further reading
 Höfig, Willi. Der deutsche Heimatfilm 1947–1960 (Stuttgart 1973), 

Film genres
Cinema of Austria
Cinema of Germany
Cinema of Switzerland
1940s in film
1950s in film
1960s in film